Bordertown is an American adult animated sitcom that aired on Fox from January 3 to May 22, 2016. The series follows two families living in a Southwest desert town on the United States–Mexico border. Bordertown is a joint production by Bento Box Entertainment, Fuzzy Door Productions, 20th Century Fox Television, Hentemann Films and syndicated by 20th Television. On May 12, 2016, the series was canceled after one season.

Plot
Bordertown takes place in the fictitious town of Mexifornia (which is on the border of California and Mexico). Mexifornia is based on the town of Calexico, California, sharing a similar location and dynamic as Mexifornia. The two main characters are Bud Buckwald and Ernesto Gonzalez. Bud is a border agent living at 25200 Cedar Road with his wife, Janice Buckwald, and their three children, Sanford, Becky and Gert. Living next door to him is Ernesto Gonzalez, an ambitious immigrant and family man, who has been in the country less than 10 years and is happy to be with his family in the United States of America.

Voice cast
 Hank Azaria as Bud Buckwald, a Border Patrol agent.
 Nicholas Gonzalez as
 Ernesto Gonzalez, Bud's Mexican neighbor who's been living in Mexifornia for 20 years.
 J.C. Gonzalez (Juan Carlos), Ernesto and Maria's 21-year-old college graduate nephew and Becky's fiancé.
 Pablo Barracuda, the biggest drug lord in Mexifornia.
 Alex Borstein as
 Janice Buckwald, Bud's wife and Becky, Sanford and Gert's mother.
 Becky Buckwald, Bud's 18-year-old daughter and J.C.'s fiancée.
 Judah Friedlander as Sanford Buckwald, Janice and Bud's 24-year-old rebellious son. In the episode "American Doll", it's revealed that Sanford was born on a skip day; 32 February, which is why he's never had any birthdays. In the same episode, it is hinted that Sanford is just a cover name and that his real name is Vince though this was previously hinted in the episode "Groundhog Day" .
 Missi Pyle as Gert Buckwald, Bud and Janice's 5-year-old daughter who is a beauty pageant contestant.
 Jacqueline Piñol as Pepito Gonzalez, Ernesto and Maria's youngest son who pranks Bud regularly.
 Efren Ramirez as Ruiz Gonzalez, Maria and Ernesto's eldest son.
 Carlos Alazraqui as
 Placido Gonzalez, Ernesto's undocumented father who is cranky.
 El Coyote, a Mexican trickster and people smuggler who always tries to cross the border and regularly taunts Bud in the cold openings.

Episodes

Production

Producers
Seth MacFarlane and Mark Hentemann were announced as executive producers. Shortly afterwards, Alex Carter and Dan Vebber were announced as co-executive producers. Lalo Alcaraz and Gustavo Arellano are consulting producers, and Valentina L. Garza is a supervising producer.

Writing
There were thirteen writers who worked on Bordertown. Mark Hentemann wrote or co-wrote three episodes. Lalo Alcaraz co-wrote the first two episodes.

Broadcast
In the United States, the series premiered midseason on January 3, 2016, on Fox. The series was picked up by ITV2 in the United Kingdom on March 23, 2015, to premiere on February 29, 2016 - immediately after the new season of Family Guy on the same channel.

The series was also picked up by Network Ten in Australia and started airing on February 3, 2016 on its sister channel, Eleven. In Canada, it was broadcast on City.

Reception
The first and only season of Bordertown received mixed to negative reviews from critics. On Metacritic, it has a weighted average score of 46 out of 100 based on 15 reviews, which indicates "mixed or average reviews". On Rotten Tomatoes, the series' first season has an approval rating of 39% based on 18 reviews, with an average rating of 5.28/10. The critics' consensus reads: "Bordertowns controversy-rich premise is an idea disappointingly ill-served by its execution, which repeatedly mistakes crass, desperate gags for topical humor."

Notes

References

External links

 
 No Walls Here: Lalo Alcaraz Discusses the New Fox Animated Series, Bordertown (The Huffington Post, December 29, 2015, interview by Daniel Olivas)

2010s American adult animated television series
2010s American animated comedy television series
2010s American sitcoms
2016 American television series debuts
2016 American television series endings
American adult animated comedy television series
American animated sitcoms
Animated television series about dysfunctional families
English-language television shows
Fox Broadcasting Company original programming
Television series by 20th Century Fox Television
Television series by Fox Television Animation
Television series by Fuzzy Door Productions
Television shows set in California
Television series created by Mark Hentemann
Latino sitcoms